Palmeiras-Barra Funda Intermodal Terminal is the second largest intermodal transportation hub in São Paulo, Brazil.  The terminal has access to the São Paulo Metro, CPTM commuter rail, and numerous bus lines.

Bus terminal

Locations served 

 Domestic destinations
 São Paulo (state)
Regions
São José do Rio Preto
Araçatuba
Presidente Prudente
Bauru
Marília
Assis
Itapetininga
Sorocaba
Piedade
Registro
Itapecerica da Serra
 Rondônia
 Acre
 Mato Grosso
 Mato Grosso do Sul
 Paraná (Except Curitiba)

 International destinations
 Bolívia
* The remaining locations are served by the Tietê and Jabaquara bus terminals.

Companies and destinations 
The following companies operate in the terminal. Its main destinations are shown in parentheses.

Domestic destinations 
São Paulo
Greater São Paulo
Selective
 Airport Service (São Paulo-Guarulhos International Airport)
Anhanguera (Osasco, Barueri, Santana de Parnaíba, Itapevi, Jandira, Carapicuíba, Pirapora do Bom Jesus)
Intervias  (Cotia)
Anhanguera (Caieiras, Franco da Rocha, Francisco Morato)
Interior
Andorinha (Presidente Prudente, Presidente Venceslau, Rosana, Assis, Palmital)
Cometa (Sorocaba, Votorantim, São Miguel Arcanjo, Itapetininga, São Roque, Salto de Pirapora, São José do Rio Preto, Catanduva, Tatuí)
Danúbio Azul (Cotia, Ibiúna, Vargem Grande Paulista, Piedade)
Expresso de Prata (Bauru, Marília, Araçatuba, Adamantina, Lençóis Paulista, Penápolis, Panorama, Tupã)
Expresso Regional (São Roque, Cotia, Itapevi, Mairinque, Araçariguama, Vargem Grande Paulista)
Intersul (Registro, Juquitiba, Miracatu, Cajati)
Itamarati (Mirassol, Jales, Votuporanga, Monte Aprazível, Fernandópolis)
Manoel Rodrigues (Avaré, Ourinhos, Itaí, Piraju, Manduri, Paranapanema)
Osastur (Avaré, Itatinga)
Princesa do Norte (Itaí)
Rápido Fênix (Botucatu, São Manuel, Conchas, Laranjal Paulista)
Reunidas Paulista (Bauru, Marília, Jaú, Birigüi, Adamantina, Araçatuba, Dracena, Lins, Ilha Solteira, Tupã, Valparaíso)
Santa Cruz (Botucatu, Jaú, Bariri, São Manuel, Barra Bonita)
São Raphael (Catiguá, Riolândia, Tabapuã, Nova Granada, Icém, Palestina)
Transpen (Ribeira, Iporanga, Capão Bonito, Itararé, Itapeva, Guapiara)
Vale do Tietê (Tietê, Salto, Botucatu, Itu, Cabreúva, Cerquilho, Laranjal Paulista, Itupeva)
Coast
Intersul (Itanhaém, Iguape, Peruíbe, Ilha Comprida, Cananéia)

Paraná
Brasil Sul (Toledo, Assis Chateaubriand, Nova Aurora, Goioerê, Campo Mourão)
Expresso Kaiowa (Londrina, Maringá, Cascavel, Ponta Grossa, Campo Mourão)
Garcia (Londrina, Maringá, Paranavaí, Terra Roxa, Cianorte, Bandeirantes, Arapongas, Cornélio Procópio)
Jóia (Pinhalão, Siqueira Campos, Jaboti, Figueira)
Ouro Branco (Londrina, Paranavaí, Porecatu, Bandeirantes, Cornélio Procópio, Santa Margarida, Sertanópolis)
Viação Pluma Internacional (Foz do Iguaçu, Cascavel, Toledo, Laranjeiras do Sul, Marechal Cândido Rondon)
Princesa do Ivaí (Arapongas, Rolândia, Mamboré, Campo Mourão, Ubiratã)
Princesa do Norte (Pinhalão, Jacarezinho, Jaboti, Wenceslau Braz, Joaquim Távora)
Princesa dos Campos (Pato Branco, Campanema, Ponta Grossa, Prudentópolis, São João, Planalto)
Transfada (Ponta Grossa, Castro, Piraí do Sul, Sengés, Jaguariaíva)

Mato Grosso
Empresa de Transportes Andorinha (Cuiabá, Rondonópolis, Pontes e Lacerda)
EUCATUR (Cuiabá, Rondonópolis, Pontes e Lacerda, Jaciara, Comodoro)
Gontijo (Cuiabá, Rondonópolis, Pontes e Lacerda, Alto Araguaia, Jaciara, Comodoro)
Itamarati (Araputanga)
Motta (Cuiabá, Rondonópolis)
Nacional Expresso (Pontes e Lacerda)
Nova Integração (Sinop, Sorriso, Várzea Grande, Alta Floresta, Nobres)
Rotas do Triângulo (Cuiabá, Pontes e Lacerda, Alto Araguaia, Várzea Grande)

Mato Grosso do Sul
Andorinha (Campo Grande)
Crucena (Porto Soares)
Viação Motta (Campo Grande, Ponta Porã, Dourados, Bela Vista, Vincentina)
Reunidas Paulista (Três Lagoas)
Itamarati (Paranaíba, Aparecida do Taboado)

Rondônia
Andorinha (Porto Velho, Ji Paraná)
Eucatur (Porto Velho, Ariquemes, Jaru, Ouro Preto do Oeste, Jí-Paraná, Presidente Médici, Cacoal, Pimenta Bueno, Vilhena)
Gontijo (Porto Velho, Ji Paraná, Vilhena)
Rotas do Triângulo (Porto Velho, Ji Paraná, Vilhena, Cacoal, Pimenta Bueno, Ouro Preto do Oeste)

Acre
Rotas do Triângulo (Rio Branco)

Goiás
Eucatur (Santa Rita do Araguaia)
Gontijo (Santa Rita do Araguaia)
Rotas do Triângulo (Jataí, Itumbiara)

Minas Gerais
Eucatur (Uberlândia, Uberaba)
Rotas do Triângulo (Frutal)

International destinations 
Bolívia
 Andorinha (Puerto Suárez)
 La Cruceña (Puerto Suárez)
 La Preferida Bus (Santa Cruz de la Sierra)

References

Transport in São Paulo